The 1982–83 Czechoslovak Extraliga season was the 40th season of the Czechoslovak Extraliga, the top level of ice hockey in Czechoslovakia. 12 teams participated in the league, and Dukla Jihlava won the championship.

Regular season

1. Liga-Qualification 
 DS Olomouc – Dukla Trenčín 0:3 (5:10, 2:5, 1:8)

External links
History of Czechoslovak ice hockey

Czechoslovak Extraliga seasons
Czech
1982–83 in Czechoslovak ice hockey